is a Japanese delicacy consisting of fresh raw fish or meat sliced into thin pieces and often eaten with soy sauce.

Origin 

The word sashimi means "pierced body", i.e. "刺身" = sashimi, where 刺 し = sashi (pierced, stuck) and 身 = mi (body, meat). This word dates from the Muromachi period and was possibly coined when the word "切る" = kiru (cut), the culinary step, was considered too inauspicious to be used by anyone other than samurai. This word may derive from the culinary practice of sticking the fish's tail and fin to the slices for the purpose of identifying the fish being eaten.

Another possibility for the name is the traditional method of harvesting. "Sashimi-grade" fish is caught by individual handline. As soon as the fish is landed, its brain is pierced with a sharp spike, and it is placed in slurried ice. This spiking is called the ikejime process, and the instantaneous death means that the fish's flesh contains a minimal amount of lactic acid. This means that the fish will keep fresh on ice for about ten days, without turning white or otherwise degrading.

Many non-Japanese use the terms sashimi and sushi interchangeably, but the two dishes are distinct and separate. Sushi refers to any dish made with vinegared rice. While raw fish is one traditional sushi ingredient, many sushi dishes contain seafood that has been cooked, and others have no seafood at all including ingredients like seaweed and vegetables. Sashimi by contrast is always served on its own. The practice of eating raw fish was introduced to Japan from China, perhaps as early as the Kamakura Period (1185-1333). An early cookbook in Japanese, written in 1489, directs that the raw flesh should be sliced and mixed with vinegar and seasonings such as salt and herbs.

Serving 

Sashimi is often the first course in a formal Japanese meal, but it can also be the main course, presented with rice and miso soup in separate bowls. Japanese chefs consider sashimi the finest dish in Japanese formal dining and recommend that it be eaten before other strong flavors affect the palate.

The sliced seafood that composes the main ingredient is typically draped over a garnish. The typical garnish is Asian white radish, daikon, shredded into long thin strands, or single leaves of the herb shiso (perilla). Garnishes for sashimi are generally called tsuma and may also include slices of other raw vegetables, such as cucumbers and carrots, as well as seaweeds, flowers and leaves and stems of other plants.

Sashimi is popularly served with a dipping sauce (soy sauce) and condiments such as wasabi paste, grated fresh ginger, gari or pickled ginger, grated fresh garlic, or ponzu for meat sashimi, and such garnishes as shiso and shredded daikon radish.
Wasabi paste is sometimes mixed directly into soy sauce as a dipping sauce, which is generally not done when eating sushi (which itself normally includes wasabi). A reputed motivation for serving wasabi with sashimi and also gari, besides its flavor, is killing harmful bacteria and parasites that could be present in raw seafood.

Preparation 
To highlight the delicate flavor as well as for texture, the chef cuts fish into different thicknesses by variety of the fish, its age and by the season. The hira-zukuri cut (literally "flat slice"), is the standard cut for most sashimi. Tuna, salmon, and kingfish are most commonly cut in this style. The usu-zukuri cut (literally "thin slice"), is an extremely thin, diagonally cut slice that is mostly used to cut firm fish, such as bream, whiting, and flounder. The fish typically cut with the ito-zukuri style include garfish and squid;  squid dish prepared in ito-zukuri is also called ika sōmen and is dipped in dashi or men-tsuyu like eating sōmen noodle.

Varieties 

Popular main ingredients for sashimi include:
 
 
 
 
 
 
 
 
 
 
 

Some sashimi ingredients, such as octopus, are sometimes served cooked given their chewy nature. Most seafood, such as tuna, salmon, and squid, are served raw. Tataki (たたき or 叩き, "pounded") is a type of sashimi that is quickly and lightly seared on the outside, leaving it raw inside.

Less common, but not unusual, sashimi ingredients are vegetarian items, such as yuba (bean curd skin), and raw red meats, such as beef (known as gyuunotataki) or horse (known as basashi). Chicken sashimi is sometimes slightly braised or seared on the outside.

Ingredients other than raw fish meat 

Food cut into small pieces and eaten with wasabi and soy sauce may be called sashimi in Japan, including the following ingredients. Like bamboo shoots, the food is enjoyed raw to appreciate the freshness, and producers and farmers offer those sashimi at their properties in top season. Some of the vegetables are enjoyed as thin sliced strips and called sashimi while they resemble fish meat, like avocado as salmon and konnyaku as puffer fish.

Vegetable
 Avocado: served as "avocado sashimi", it is considered to have a texture similar to raw or slightly salted fatty salmon. It is eaten with wasabi soy sauce.
 Bamboo shoots: farmers of bamboo grove serves takenoko in course menu, and sashimi is almost always entered during the high season of harvest.
 Japanese radish: among many varieties of vegetables eaten fresh, it is said that the flavor stands out when tasted within a couple of hours after harvesting, and called sashimi vegetables instead of very fresh salad.
 Konnyaku: cut into short thin strips resembling puffer fish meat, thus called yama fugu (mountain puffer fish) in some regions. Served with vinegar and miso, wasabi and soy sauce, vinegar and soy sauce.
 Yuba, or tofu skin: while there are restaurants where customers cook their own yuba and eat while it is hot, yuba-sashi or sashimi of yuba is chilled and served with wasabi soy sauce or vinegar miso.

Others
 Fishcake: one among the express menu on izakaya menu, offered as Itawasa.
 Seaweed: wakame is in strict sense not eaten raw but dipped in boiling water for a few seconds, and enjoyed the fresh green color, with wasabi soy sauce. Marinating with vinegar and miso sauce is popular as well.

Meat
 Beef, pork, and poultry: bought from licensed butchers and processors, those were served raw, and cases are that the restaurant offer slightly cooked meat as sashimi to avoid high risk of food poisoning and parasite infection, by treating meat in boiling water (yubiki) or braised with gas torch (aburi). Served with ponzu citrus vinegar.
 Chiragaa: boiled face skin of pork, served with vinegar and miso sauce, also served as Okinawa cuisine.
 Goat meat: Okinawa cuisine, served with soy sauce and grated ginger.
 Horse meat: offered with grated garlic and soy sauce.
 Mimigaa: boiled ears of pork, also served as Okinawa cuisine.
 Offal: advised to buy from meat processors or restaurants with licenses, as fatal food poisoning happened in Japan with beef liver.
 Wild meat: boar as Okinawa cuisine consumed on Iriomote and Ishigaki islands and boiled meat is served. Deer meat.

Safety 
As a raw food, consuming sashimi can result in foodborne illness when bacteria or parasites are present; for example, anisakiasis is a disease caused by the accidental ingestion of larval nematodes in the family Anisakidae, primarily Anisakis simplex  but also Pseudoterranova decipiens. In addition, incorrectly prepared Fugu fish may contain tetrodotoxin, a potent neurotoxin.

Another type of food borne illness that could occur after consuming tainted sashimi is Diphyllobothriasis. This disease is an infection within the intestines that occurs when the tapeworm Diphyllobothrium latum is consumed. Common fish such as trout, salmon, pike, and sea bass harbor this parasitic larva in their muscles. Since the innovation of the chilled transport system paired with the salmon and trout consumption, an increasing number of cases have been recorded annually in northern Japan due to the spread of this disease.

Traditionally, fish that spend at least part of their lives in brackish or fresh water were considered unsuitable for sashimi because of the possibility of parasites. For example, salmon, an anadromous fish, is not traditionally eaten straight out of the river. A study in Seattle, Washington, showed that all wild salmon had roundworm larvae capable of infecting people, while farm-raised salmon did not have any roundworm larvae. However a study commissioned by the Pew Foundation found that total organic contaminants were consistently and significantly more concentrated in the farmed salmon as a group than in wild salmon.

Freezing is often used to kill parasites. According to European Union regulations, freezing fish at −20 °C (−4 °F) for 24 hours kills parasites. The U.S. Food and Drug Administration (FDA) recommends freezing at −35 °C (−31 °F) for 15 hours, or at −20 °C (−4 °F) for 7 days.

While Canada does not federally regulate freezing fish, British Columbia and Alberta voluntarily adhere to guidelines similar to the FDA's. Ontario attempted to legislate freezing as part of raw food handling requirements, though this was soon withdrawn due to protests by the industry that the subtle flavors and texture of raw fish would be destroyed by freezing. Instead, Ontario has decided to consider regulations on how raw fish must be handled prior to serving.

Some fish for sashimi are treated with carbon monoxide to keep the flesh red for a longer time in storage. This practice can make spoiled fish appear fresh.

Eating chicken sashimi is a serious food poisoning risk. Despite it being on menus, it is hard to find, and many chefs cook it incorrectly. Chicken sashimi is also often sourced at certain restaurants from the thigh, liver and outer breast.

Environmental concerns 
With the constant amount of fishing, bluefin tuna population rates have been steadily declining. A proposed solution has been farming bluefin tuna in fisheries. Historically, this has posed a problem in that the captive fish are not raised from spawn, but rather from small wild fish that are netted and transported to the farms, mostly in the Mediterranean. However, Japanese scientists have found a way to successfully breed and raise the fish entirely in captivity. Despite this technical accomplishment, this may not lead to a viable solution to maintain a sustainable bluefin population, because chefs and consumers see wild bluefin to be more appetizing, and look down upon farmed bluefin.

See also 

 Surimi
 Ikizukuri (live sashimi)
 Kuai (dish)
 Hoe (dish)
 Carpaccio
 Kinilaw
 Steak tartare
 Stroganina
 Tiradito
 List of raw fish dishes
 Mercury in fish
 Ceviche

Notes

References

External links 

   On the garnishes for sashimi.

Animal-based seafood
Japanese cuisine
Japanese cuisine terms
Uncooked fish dishes
Raw foods
Sliced foods
Types of food